Stade Am Pëtz is a football stadium in Weidingen, Wiltz, in northern Luxembourg.

It is currently the home stadium of FC Wiltz 71.  The stadium has a capacity of 3,000. FC Wiltz used to play at the Stade Géitz, near the town centre.

References

Am Petz
Buildings and structures in Wiltz